"Your Mirror" is a song by British soul and pop band Simply Red. Written by Mick Hucknall, it was released in July 1992 as the fifth single from their fourth album, Stars (1991), and reached number 17 on the UK Singles Chart. The song was later included on the band's compilation albums, Greatest Hits in 1996, Simply Red 25: The Greatest Hits in 2008 (on which an alternative recording with a prominent guitar solo is featured) and Song Book 1985–2010 in 2013.

Critical reception
Rik Ambelle from Crawley News complimented the song as "haunting". Dave Tianene from Milwaukee Sentinel described it as "a sort of inner dialogue of a man torn between idealism and cynicism, done in Temptations ballad style." Robbert Tilli from Music & Media felt that it showcases Hucknall's "talent for writing soulful pop." In an retrospective review, Pop Rescue found that it's "stronger" than the previous songs on the Stars album, "with its bass and piano hooks", adding further that the singer "takes a harder lyrical and vocal approach, almost menacing at times." Johnny Dee from Smash Hits declared it as a "great tune", and "dreamy and wafty". Another editor, Polly Birkbeck, said it's "a droning slowie with a chorus of birdies chirping all through it."

Track listings
 YZ689 7-inch
 "Your Mirror"
 "Your Mirror" (live)

 YZ689C cassette
 "Your Mirror"
 "Your Mirror" (live)

 YZ689CD holographic disc
 "Your Mirror"
 "Sad Old Red" (live)
 "She’s Got It Bad" (live)

 YZ689CDX limited-edition holographic disc
 "Your Mirror" (live)
 "More" (live)
 "Something Got Me Started" (Live)

Charts

References

1991 songs
1992 singles
Simply Red songs
Songs written by Mick Hucknall